The Virgin Islands Track & Field Federation (VITFF) is the governing body for the sport of athletics in the United States Virgin Islands.  Current president is Ronald Russell.

History 
VITFF was founded in 1963 and was affiliated to the IAAF in 1966.

Affiliations 
VITFF is the national member federation for the United States Virgin Islands in the following international organisations:
International Association of Athletics Federations (IAAF)
North American, Central American and Caribbean Athletic Association (NACAC)
Association of Panamerican Athletics (APA)
Central American and Caribbean Athletic Confederation (CACAC)
Leeward Islands Athletics Association (LIAA)
Moreover, it is part of the following national organisations:
Virgin Islands Olympic Committee (VIOC)

National records 
VITFF maintains the United States Virgin Islands records in track and field.

References 

United States Virgin Islands
Sports governing bodies in the United States Virgin Islands
Athletics in the United States Virgin Islands
National governing bodies for athletics
Sports organizations established in 1963
1963 establishments in the United States Virgin Islands